Javier Fernández-Lasquetty y Blanc (born 8 October 1966) is a Spanish politician from the People's Party of the Community of Madrid (PP), serving as Cabinet Minister of Finance and Civil Service of the Community of Madrid since August 2019, and previously as Cabinet Minister of Health between March 2010 and January 2014. He is also serving as acting Cabinet Minister of Economy, Employment and Competitiveness since March 2021.

References

1966 births
Living people
People's Party (Spain) politicians
People from Madrid